Jiří Ješeta (born 30 January 1970) is a retired Czech football midfielder.

References

1970 births
Living people
Czech footballers
FK Hvězda Cheb players
FC Slovan Liberec players
AFK Atlantic Lázně Bohdaneč players
FK Baník Most players
Czechoslovak First League players
Czech First League players
Association football midfielders
Czech expatriate footballers
Expatriate footballers in Germany
Czech expatriate sportspeople in Germany